Hung Shui Kiu is an area between Ping Shan and Lam Tei, in the western part of the New Territories of Hong Kong. It covers parts of Yuen Long and 
Tuen Mun districts. It is a largely rural residential area. Several Housing Authority blocks are currently under construction on a 6.5-hectare site bounded by Tin Sam, Hung Tin, Hung Chi and Hung Yuen roads.

New town
The "Planning and Development Study on North West New Territories", conducted from 1997 to 2003, identified Hung Shui Kiu and its vicinity as a potential site for a New Town which may accommodate up to 160,000 population in the future. This proposal has since been recommended for implementation and would involve construction of a new Hung Shui Kiu railway station along the existing West Rail line between Siu Hong and Tin Shui Wai stations.

The government is conducting public engagement on the plan. A public meeting took place on 8 August 2015 at Shung Tak Catholic English College in Hung Shui Kiu and the Planning Department accepted written comments by mail or email.

In 2015, the first public estate in Hung Shui Kiu, called Hung Fuk Estate, was completed. It comprises nine residential blocks with 4,900 flats as well as a shopping centre, a market, and a community building.

Transport
Hung Shui Kiu is connected by Castle Peak Road. There is also a Light Rail stop, served by routes 610, 614, 615, and 751. There is a proposed MTR station on the Tuen Ma line for Hung Shui Kiu called Hung Shui Kiu station.

Education
Hung Shui Kiu is in Primary One Admission (POA) School Net 72. Within the school net are multiple aided schools (operated independently but funded with government money) and one government school: Tin Shui Wai Government Primary School (天水圍官立小學).

See also
List of streets and roads in Hong Kong
Tin Sam Tsuen, Hung Shui Kiu
Route 9 (Hong Kong)
Tin Shui Wai
Yuen Long
Tuen Ma Line

References

Further reading

External links 

 Hung Shui Kiu New Development Area

 
Places in Hong Kong